Pagonis Vakalopoulos (Greek: Παγώνης Βακαλόπουλος; born 24 January 1965) is a retired Greek footballer. He started his career in Polykastro, spent most of his career with Iraklis with which he won Balkans Cup and finished his playing career with Panionios. Currently he is the manager of Iraklis U20 team.

Playing career

Career

He started his career in his home town club, Polykastro. In December 1984, he transferred to Iraklis, where he spent the biggest part of his career. While playing for Iraklis he won the Balkans Cup in 1985 and was a runner-up of the Greek Cup in 1987. In 1995, he moved to Panionios, where he retired from football after one season.

International career

Vakalopoulos was a member of the Greek U21 team, that reached the final of 1988 UEFA European Under-21 Football Championship. He earned 10 caps for the Greece national team and scored once. He debuted in a home defeat against Netherlands on 16 December 1987. Vakalopoulos scored his only goal at the international level in a friendly win against Norway. His last international appearance was against Sweden on 17 April 1991.

Coaching career
On 30 July 2013 was hired as a manager for the under-20 team of Iraklis. He had previously worked as an assistant in Iraklis first team, under Marinos Ouzounidis.

Honours
Iraklis
Balkans Cup: 1985

References

1965 births
Living people
Association football defenders
Greek footballers
Greece international footballers
Greece under-21 international footballers
Iraklis Thessaloniki F.C. players
Panionios F.C. players
Super League Greece players
People from Kilkis (regional unit)
Footballers from Central Macedonia